Laytown railway station serves Laytown and Bettystown in County Meath, Ireland.

It is about 20 minutes' walk from the venue of yearly Laytown races.

History

The station opened on 25 May 1844 and was renamed by the Great Northern Railway as Laytown & Bettystown in 1913. It was since renamed back to Laytown.

See also
 List of railway stations in Ireland

References

External links 

 Irish Rail Laytown Station Website
 Eiretrains - Laytown Station

Iarnród Éireann stations in County Meath
Railway stations in County Meath
Railway stations opened in 1844
Railway stations in the Republic of Ireland opened in 1844